Robert H. Holloway (May 4, 1918 -  November 21, 2005) was a lawyer and state legislator in Illinois. He was elected to the Illinois House in 1972.

Early life and education 
African American Robert Herrod Holloway, son of Robert Amos Holloway and Francis (née Morgan) Holloway, was born in Emmet, Arkansas, on May 4, 19818.

He was a soldier during World War II, completing Officer Candidates School, achieving the rank of Captain, and serving in North Africa as the commander of a Port Battalion and Recreation Facility.

Holloway earned a law degree from Loyola University in 1949.

Career 
Holloway had his own law firm in Chicago. After nine years in private practice, he was appointed to the State's attorneys office, where he served as an assistant State's attorney from 1957 to 67. He ran for clerk of the Illinois appellate court in 1962, but lost to incumbent Leslie Beck.

Holloway became a 6th Ward Republican committeeman in 1968. He was an assistant to the sheriff of Cook County from 1968–69, and by 1972 he was an assistant Illinois Attorney General.

A Republican, he served in the Illinois House of Representatives, representing District 29 from 1973–1975.

References

1918 births
2005 deaths
Military personnel from Chicago
United States Army personnel of World War II
Republican Party members of the Illinois House of Representatives
Politicians from Chicago
Lawyers from Chicago
20th-century American politicians
20th-century African-American politicians
Loyola University Chicago School of Law alumni